Gahuiyeh (also Romanized as Gahū’īyeh; also known as Gahu and Kahū’īyeh) is a village in Hoseynabad-e Goruh Rural District, Rayen District, Kerman County, Kerman Province, Iran. At the 2006 census, its population was 65, in 19 families.

References 

Populated places in Kerman County